Geoffrey Michael Elliott (7 April 1931 – 12 October 2014) was a pole vaulter, shot putter and decathlete from England. He was born in Ilford.

Athletics career
He represented Great Britain in both the pole vault and decathlon events at the 1952 Olympic games in Helsinki. He set his personal best in the pole vault (4.30 metres) on 28 August 1954 in Bern. He represented England and won a gold medal in the pole vault at the 1954 British Empire and Commonwealth Games in Vancouver, Canada. Four years later, in Cardiff he repeated the success at the 1958 British Empire and Commonwealth Games. Just before those games, he was one of many signatories in a letter to The Times on 17 July 1958 opposing 'the policy of apartheid' in international sport and defending 'the principle of racial equality which is embodied in the Declaration of the Olympic Games'.

Achievements

References

 Brown, Geoff and Hogsbjerg, Christian. Apartheid is not a Game: Remembering the Stop the Seventy Tour campaign. London: Redwords, 2020. .
 British Olympic Committee
 

1931 births
2014 deaths
British decathletes
British male pole vaulters
British male shot putters
English male pole vaulters
Athletes (track and field) at the 1952 Summer Olympics
Olympic athletes of Great Britain
Athletes (track and field) at the 1954 British Empire and Commonwealth Games
Athletes (track and field) at the 1958 British Empire and Commonwealth Games
Commonwealth Games gold medallists for England
European Athletics Championships medalists
English male shot putters
English decathletes
People from Ilford
Commonwealth Games medallists in athletics
Medallists at the 1954 British Empire and Commonwealth Games
Medallists at the 1958 British Empire and Commonwealth Games